Kyle M. Green Jr. is an American attorney and politician serving as a member of the Louisiana House of Representatives from the 83rd district. Elected in 2019, he assumed office on January 13, 2020.

Early life and education 
Green is a native of Marrero, Louisiana, in Jefferson Parish, a suburb of the Greater New Orleans Metropolitan Area. After graduating from Archbishop Shaw High School in 2005, he earned a Bachelor of Arts degree in political science from Southern University and A&M College in Baton Rouge, Louisiana in 2009, and a Juris Doctor from the Southern University Law Center, also in Baton Rouge, Louisiana in 2015.

Career 
During college, Green was an intern in the United States House of Representatives. He was also a substitute teacher in the East Baton Rouge Parish Public Schools. In 2011 and 2012, Green worked as a State Farm insurance agent. In 2014 and 2015, he was a law clerk for the Louisiana Department of Insurance. Green later established a private legal practice and served as assistant Attorney General of Louisiana. Green was elected to the Louisiana House of Representatives in 2019. He assumed office on January 13, 2020, succeeding Robert Billiot.

References 

Living people
Politicians from New Orleans
Southern University at New Orleans alumni
Southern University Law Center alumni
Democratic Party members of the Louisiana House of Representatives
Louisiana lawyers
21st-century American politicians
Year of birth missing (living people)